Ashadeepam is a 1953 Indian Malayalam-language film, directed by G. R. Rao and produced by T. E. Vasudevan. The film stars Sathyan, B. S. Saroja, Gemini Ganesan and Padmini. The film had a musical score by V. Dakshinamoorthy. The film was also simultaneously produced in Tamil under the title Aasai Magan.

Malayalam Cast 

Male cast
 Gemini Ganesan as Sekhar
 T. S. Balaiah as Vikraman
 Sathyan as Chandran
 V. Dakshinamoorthy as School Teacher
 T. N. Gopinathan Nair as Panicker
 J. Sasikumar
 Nanukkuttan

Female cast
 Padmini as Jayanthi
 B. S. Saroja as Shantha
 Pankajavalli as Bhanu Amma
 Girija as Sarala
 Aranmula Ponnamma as Lakshmi Amma

Tamil Cast 
Cast adapted from the song book

Male cast
 R. Ganesh as Sekhar
 B. R. Panthulu as Sadhasiva Mudaliar
 T. S. Balaiah as Vikraman
 Sathyan as Chandran
 T. P. Ponnusami Pillai as Post Master
 Friend Ramasami as Kanaka Pillai
 Master Sethu as Sekhar (Jr)
 Master Sheriff as Chandran (Jr)

Female cast
 Padmini as Jayanthi
 B. S. Saroja as Shantha
 Pankajavalli as Mangalam
 Girija as Sarala
 T. N. Meenakshi as Lakshmi
 Baby Vasanthi as Shantha (Jr)

Support Cast
 S. S. Sivasooriyan, T. V. Sethuraman, V. P. S. Mani, V. T. Kalyanam, Pottai Krishnamoorthi, and Angamuthu.

Soundtrack 
The music was composed by V. Dakshinamoorthy.

Malayalam

Tamil 
Lyrics were penned by Kuyilan. One song from Tyagaraja's composition. Playback singers are: P. Leela, M. L. Vasanthakumari, Jikki, Ghantasala, V. J. Varma and A. M. Rajah.

References

External links 
 
 
  - Tyagaraja Kriti from the film

1953 films
1950s Malayalam-language films